Emily Maglio (born 13 November 1996 Cranbrook) is a Canadian female volleyball player. 
She was part of the Canada women's national volleyball team, and participated at the 2018 Women's Pan-American Volleyball Cup, and 2018 FIVB Volleyball Women's World Championship.

She played for the University of Hawaii at Manoa.

References

External links 

 FIVB profile
 Hawaii Athletics Roster
 Emily Maglio Named to Canadian National Team
 Rainbow Wahine volleyball's Emily Maglio earns AVCA second team all-America selection

Living people
1996 births
Canadian women's volleyball players
Hawaii Rainbow Wahine volleyball players
Middle blockers